Subrat Kumar Panda (born 1954) is an Indian virologist, professor and Head Department of Pathology at All India Institute of Medical Sciences, Delhi. Known for his researches in viral hepatitis, Panda is an elected fellow of the Indian Academy of Sciences, Indian National Science Academy and the National Academy of Medical Sciences. The Council of Scientific and Industrial Research, the apex agency of the Government of India for scientific research, awarded him the Shanti Swarup Bhatnagar Prize for Science and Technology, one of the highest Indian science awards for his contributions to Medical Sciences in 1995.

Biography 

Born on 18 November 1954 in the Indian state of Odisha, S. K. Panda graduated in medicine from SCB Medical College, Cuttack in 1977 and earned an MD from the All India Institute of Medical Sciences, Delhi in 1981. Subsequently, he moved to the UK where he did his post-doctoral studies at the laboratory of Arie Zuckerman of London School of Tropical Medicine which he completed in 1987. Returning to India, he joined AIIMS Delhi as a member of faculty at the department of pathology and serves as the professor and head of the department.

Panda is married to Gita Satpathy, a professor of microbiology at AIIMS, Delhi and the family lives in AIIMS campus.

Legacy 
Panda, whose researches covered the fields of Molecular Virology and Liver Pathology, is known to have contributed to the wider understanding of viral hepatitis. He carried out extensive researches on various types of hepatitis virus such a B, C and E and elucidated the replication and transcription processes of Hepatitis E virus. These studies, based on Rhesus monkeys, demonstrated the relationship of the virus with liver diseases and protracted viremia. His researches have been documented by way of several articles; and online article repositories like Google Scholar and ResearchGate have listed a number of them.

Awards and honors 
The Council of Scientific and Industrial Research awarded him Shanti Swarup Bhatnagar Prize, one of the highest Indian science awards in 1995. Indian Academy of Sciences elected him as a fellow the same year, followed by the National Academy of Medical Sciences and the Indian National Science Academy in 2010.

Selected bibliography

See also 
 Herpes simplex

Notes

References

External links 
 

Indian medical writers
1954 births
Medical doctors from Odisha
Indian pathologists
Indian virologists
Utkal University alumni
All India Institute of Medical Sciences, New Delhi alumni
Alumni of the London School of Hygiene & Tropical Medicine
Academic staff of the All India Institute of Medical Sciences, New Delhi
Recipients of the Shanti Swarup Bhatnagar Award in Medical Science
Fellows of the National Academy of Medical Sciences
Fellows of the Indian Academy of Sciences
Fellows of the Indian National Science Academy
Living people